Opuntia humifusa, commonly known as the devil's-tongue, Eastern prickly pear or Indian fig, is a cactus of the genus Opuntia present in parts of the eastern United States, Mississippi and northeastern Mexico.

Description
As is the case in other Opuntia species, the green stems of this low-growing perennial cactus are flattened, and are formed of segments. Barbed bristles are found around the surfaces of the segments, and longer spines are sometimes present. The flowers are yellow to gold in color, and are found along the margins of mature segments. The flowers are waxy and sometimes have red centers. This cactus blooms in the late spring.

As the fruit matures, it changes color from green to red, and often remains on the cactus until the following spring. There are 6 to 33 small, flat, light-colored seeds in each fruit.

Taxonomy
Some botanists treat this cactus as a variety of O. compressa: hence  O. c. var. humifusa, or a synonym of O. compressa. Those recognizing this species treat O. rafinesquii as a junior synonym.

Distribution
This species naturally occurs along the East Coast of the United States, including on barrier islands from the Florida Keys to coastal Massachusetts. Eastern prickly pear is found is scattered locations from New Mexico and Montana eastward, and is one of two cactus species native to the eastern United States, along with the related O. cespitosa.  Since eastern prickly pear grows in hot, sunny locations with thin soil that does not hold water, it is found in shale barrens, which are accumulations of thin, flat, eroded sedimentary rock on steep slopes with southern exposures - essentially a desert microclimate - in the Appalachian Mountains.

Habitat
This plant is very intolerant of shade and instead thrives in sunny, hot and dry environments with well-draining, sandy soil.  O. humifusa will grow in open areas in sandy, rocky and coastal scrub habits. It is capable of surviving cool winters unlike many cacti, although harsh winter storms are known to cause habitat loss.

Uses 
The fruits are edible, but have small spiny bristles. The pulp can be scooped and the seeds strained out to make syrup or jelly. The seeds can be briefly roasted and ground into meal. Young cactus segments can be roasted to remove spines, then peeled and sliced to be eaten like string beans; alternatively, they can be deep fried. The leafy segments can be peeled and chewed for emergency hydration.

Gallery

References

External links 
 
  Flowering Opuntia humifusa
 Canadian government recovery strategy for Eastern Prickly Pear
 University of Florida - Gardening Solutions - Prickly pear
 Opuntia humifusa images at bioimages.vanderbilt.edu
 Opuntia humifusa photo gallery at Opuntia Web

humifusa
Cacti of the United States
Edible plants
Flora of North America
Plants described in 1820